Thomas Becker (born October 26, 1948) is an American bobsledder. He competed at the 1972 Winter Olympics and the 1976 Winter Olympics.

References

1948 births
Living people
American male bobsledders
Olympic bobsledders of the United States
Bobsledders at the 1972 Winter Olympics
Bobsledders at the 1976 Winter Olympics
Sportspeople from Indianapolis